Nikolay Nikolayevich Obolsky (born 14 January 1997) is a Russian professional footballer who plays as a forward in Spain for Cultural Leonesa.

Club career
He made his professional debut on 19 July 2015 for FC Dynamo Moscow in a Russian Premier League game against FC Zenit Saint Petersburg.

On 17 February 2020, he joined FC Nizhny Novgorod on loan until the end of the 2019–20 season.

On 29 August 2020, he joined Spanish club Barakaldo CF. On 2 July 2021, he signed with Cultural Leonesa.

Career statistics

Personal life
His (non-identical) twin brother Maksim Obolsky is also a footballer, with FC Metallurg Vidnoye for the 2020–21 season.

References

External links 
 
 

1997 births
Living people
Twin sportspeople
Russian twins
Sportspeople from Tula, Russia
Russian footballers
Association football forwards
Russian Premier League players
Russian First League players
Russian Second League players
FC Dynamo Moscow players
FC Dynamo Moscow reserves players
PFC Sochi players
FC Nizhny Novgorod (2015) players
Segunda División B players
Barakaldo CF footballers
Cultural Leonesa footballers
Russian expatriate footballers
Expatriate footballers in Spain
Russia youth international footballers
Russia under-21 international footballers